Penicillium citrioviride is a fungus species of the genus of Penicillium which produces neurotoxic citrioviridin.

See also
List of Penicillium species

References

Further reading

 

citrioviride